Cherrystone Creek is a  long 3rd order tributary to the Banister River in Pittsylvania County, Virginia. This is the only stream of this name in the United States.

Course 
Cherrystone Creek rises about 0.5 miles northeast of Redeye, Virginia and then flows southeast and turns northeast to join the Banister River about 2 miles southwest of Motleys Mill.

Watershed 
Cherrystone Creek drains  of area, receives about 45.7 in/year of precipitation, has a wetness index of 398.40, and is about 46% forested.

See also 
 List of Virginia Rivers

References 

Rivers of Virginia
Rivers of Pittsylvania County, Virginia
Tributaries of the Roanoke River